Teulisna plagiata is a moth in the family Erebidae. It was described by Francis Walker in 1862. It is found on Borneo. The habitat consists of lower montane forests.

References
Notes

Sources

Moths described in 1862
plagiata